Vasyl Kostyuk (born 9 February 1989, Ukraine) is a professional Ukrainian football striker who plays for Zorya in the Ukrainian Premier League. He is the product of the Dynamo Kyiv Youth school system.

External links
 Official Website Profile
 Profile on EUFO
 RVUFK website

1989 births
People from Lebedyn
Ukrainian footballers
Living people
FC Zorya Luhansk players
FC Dynamo Kyiv players
Association football forwards
Sportspeople from Sumy Oblast